CCGS Jean Goodwill is an icebreaking anchor handling tug supply vessel (AHTS) converted to a medium class icebreaker for the Canadian Coast Guard. She was originally built as Balder Viking for Trans Viking Icebreaking & Offshore AS in 2000. The vessel was sold to Canada in 2018 and was initially expected to enter service in late 2019 following a refit. However, due to delays the conversion of the vessel was not completed until November 2020.

Design 

Originally built to DNV ice class "ICE-10 Icebreaker", her hull structures and propulsion system will be upgraded to Polar Class 4 level and the vessel will be rated as Arctic Class 3 in Canadian service. Originally she was served by a crew of 23, but this will be reduced to 19 (9 officers and 10 crew) when the vessel is commissioned by the Canadian Coast Guard. There are also 9 additional berths.

CCGS Jean Goodwill has four medium-speed diesel engines geared to two controllable pitch propellers in nozzles. In addition, she has two bow thrusters (one fixed, one retractable and azimuthing) and one transverse stern thruster for maneuvering and dynamic positioning.

Career

Balder Viking (2000–2018) 

She has been employed supplying offshore arctic petroleum drilling expedition.

Edinburgh-based oil company Cairn Energy UK PLC for four months, starting in June 2010, for drilling operations in Baffin Bay.

CCGS Jean Goodwill (2020–present) 

In 2016, Chantier Davie Canada began offering Balder Viking and her sister ships as a replacement to the ageing Canadian Coast Guard icebreakers under the moniker Project Resolute. In addition to the three Swedish icebreaking offshore vessels, the offer also included a fourth slightly bigger and more powerful vessel, the US-flagged . In August 2018, Chantier Davie Canada was awarded a Can$610 million dollar contract for the acquisition and refitting of the three vessels. On 10 August 2018, Viking Supply Ships announced the sale of its three vessels to Her Majesty the Queen in Right of Canada for a profit of $274 million. Once retrofitted at Davie Shipbuilding, the vessels are expected to remain in service in the Canadian Coast Guard for 15 to 25 years.

Balder Viking was renamed CCGS Jean Goodwill after Jean Cuthand Goodwill (1928–1997), a Canadian Cree nurse who, in 1954, became Saskatchewan's first Aboriginal woman to finish a nursing program. The vessel was delivered to the Canadian Coast Guard fleet in November 2020 and officially commissioned in August 2022.

References

 

Icebreakers of the Canadian Coast Guard
2000 ships